= ARCA Menards Series (disambiguation) =

ARCA Menards Series may refer to:

- ARCA Menards Series, a national racing division in the United States
- ARCA Menards Series East, a regional racing division in the eastern United States
- ARCA Menards Series West, a regional racing division in the western United States
